Barbana is a small settlement in the Municipality of Brda in the Littoral region of Slovenia, on the border with Italy.

References

External links
Barbana on Geopedia

Populated places in the Municipality of Brda